Mexborough is a town and a ward in the metropolitan borough of Doncaster, South Yorkshire, England.  The ward contains two listed buildings that are recorded in the National Heritage List for England.  Of these, one is listed at Grade I, the highest of the three grades, and the other is at Grade II, the lowest grade.  The listed buildings consist of a church and a free-standing carved arch.


Key

Buildings

Notes
For Mexborough railway station see Listed buildings in Conisbrough and Denaby

References

Citations

Sources

 

Lists of listed buildings in South Yorkshire
Buildings and structures in the Metropolitan Borough of Doncaster
Listed